The Missouri Department of Conservation (MDC) administers hundreds of parcels of land in all counties of the state.  Most areas are owned by the department; some are leased by the department; some areas are managed under contract by the department; and some areas are leased to other entities for management.  The department has divided the counties of the state into eight administrative regions for the purpose of managing these lands and providing conservation services to the citizens of the state.

Central 

The Central Region is encompasses of these counties:

The regional office is in Columbia.

Kansas City Area

The Kansas City Region is encompasses these counties:

The regional conservation office is in Lee's Summit.

Northeast 

The Northeast region encompasses these counties:

The regional conservation office is in Kirksville.

Northwest 

The Northwest Region encompasses these counties:

The regional conservation office is in St. Joseph.

Ozark 

The Ozark Region encompasses these counties:

The regional conservation office is in West Plains.

Southeast 

The Southeast Region encompasses these counties:

The regional conservation office is in Cape Girardeau.

Southwest 

The Southwest Region encompasses these counties:

The regional conservation office is in Springfield.

St. Louis Area

The St. Louis Region encompasses these counties:

The regional conservation office is in St. Charles.

Notes 

Environment of Missouri
Conservation Areas of Missouri